Henry Gregg may refer to:
 Harry Gregg (19322020), Northern Irish footballer whose birthname was Henry
 Henry Gregg (1826), British barrister